Calker is a surname. Notable people with the name include:

Arnold van Calker (born 1976), Dutch bobsledder
Barend Christiaan van Calker (1738–1813), Dutch medallist
Darrell Calker (1905–1964), American composer and arranger
Edwin van Calker (born 1979), Dutch bobsledder
Friedrich Calker (1790–1870), German philosopher